Sancho Manuel de Vilhena, 1st Count of Vila Flor (1610–3 February 1677), was a Portuguese aristocrat and military leader, of royal background.

He participated in several battles in Central Europe and fought the Dutch in Brazil between 1638 and 1640. During the Portuguese Restoration War, he was appointed general, and participated in the defence of Beira. His greatest victories were the Battle of the Lines of Elvas in 1659 and the Battle of Ameixial in 1663.

António Manuel de Vilhena, Grand Master of the Order of Saint John and ruler of Malta, was his fifth son.

He was memorialized in a prominent azulejo of the Room of the Battles in the Palace of the Marquises of Fronteira, created in 1671-1672 and depicting the Battle of Ameixial.

References

Portuguese military commanders of the Portuguese Restoration War
Portuguese generals
1610 births
1677 deaths
Portuguese nobility
17th-century Portuguese people
People of the Dutch–Portuguese War
People from Lisbon